The 1999–2000 season was the 97th for the Southern Football League. At the end of the previous season Midland Division was renamed Western Division, and Southern Division was renamed Eastern Division.

Boston United won the Premier Division and earned promotion to the Football Conference. Atherstone United, Gloucester City, Grantham Town and Rothwell Town were relegated from the Premier Division, whilst Folkestone Invicta, Moor Green, Fisher Athletic and Stafford Rangers were promoted from the Eastern and Western divisions, the former two as champions. Fleet Town, Yate Town and Stourbridge were relegated to the eighth level whilst Raunds Town resigned from the league.

Premier Division
The Premier Division consisted of 22 clubs, including 18 clubs from the previous season and four new clubs:
Two clubs promoted from the Midland Division:
Clevedon Town
Newport, who also changed name to Newport County.

Two clubs promoted from the Southern Division:
Havant & Waterlooville
Margate

League table

Eastern Division
The Eastern Division consisted of 22 clubs, including 16 clubs from the previous season Southern Division and six new clubs:
Three clubs transferred from the Midland Division:
Stamford
VS Rugby
Wisbech Town

Plus:
Burnham, promoted from the Hellenic League
Hastings Town, demoted from the Premier Division
Spalding United, promoted from the United Counties League

League table

Western Division
The Western Division consisted of 22 clubs, including 16 clubs from the previous season Midland Division and six new clubs:
Two clubs transferred from the Southern Division:
Cirencester Town
Yate Town

Two clubs relegated from the Premier Division:
Bromsgrove Rovers
Gresley Rovers

Plus:
Rocester, promoted from the Midland Alliance
Tiverton Town, promoted from the Western League

League table

See also
1999–2000 Isthmian League
1999–2000 Northern Premier League
Southern Football League

References
RSSF – Southern Football League archive

Southern Football League seasons
6